Oregon Chai is an American beverage company based in Portland, Oregon. The company provides a line of chai beverage products, including a concentrate designed to make a hot, tea-based beverage prepared with steamed milk, vanilla, a sweetener (usually sugar or honey), and other spices.

Company
The company was co-founded in 1994 by Heather Howitt, Tedde McMillen, Carla Powell, Brian Ross and Lori Spencer, selling to local cafés.  Sales in 1996 rose by 469%, and by 2000 sales were over $15 million, including export abroad to countries including Saudi Arabia.

The company was purchased in 2004 by Kerry Group, a giant Irish food conglomerate.  Its offices were moved to Waukesha, Wisconsin, in 2005.

References

External links

Tea companies of the United States
Companies based in Portland, Oregon
Food and drink companies established in 1994
Privately held companies based in Oregon
1994 establishments in Oregon